Igor Arnáez Martín (born 30 April 1991) is a Spanish footballer who plays for Arenas Club de Getxo as a left back.

Club career
Born in Bilbao, Biscay, Basque Country, Arnáez graduated with Danok Bat CF's youth setup, after a short stint with Athletic Bilbao. He made his debuts as a senior with SD Lemona in the 2010–11 campaign, in Segunda División B.

In July 2011 Arnáez returned to Athletic, being assigned to the reserves also in the third level. However, after appearing sparingly, he was loaned to fellow league teams Sestao River Club and SD Amorebieta, respectively.

On 26 May 2014 Arnáez was released by the Lions, and moved to Segunda División's CD Tenerife on 27 August. He played his first match as a professional on 9 September, starting and playing the full 90 minutes in a 0–0 away draw against Girona FC for the season's Copa del Rey.

References

External links

1991 births
Living people
Spanish footballers
Footballers from Bilbao
Association football defenders
Segunda División B players
SD Lemona footballers
Bilbao Athletic footballers
Sestao River footballers
SD Amorebieta footballers
CD Tenerife players
Barakaldo CF footballers
Arenas Club de Getxo footballers
Danok Bat CF players